Walton Mountain is in the Lewis Range, Glacier National Park in the U.S. state of Montana. Two unnamed hanging glaciers are located to the east and northeast of the summit.

See also
 Mountains and mountain ranges of Glacier National Park (U.S.)

References

Mountains of Flathead County, Montana
Walton Mountain
Lewis Range
Mountains of Montana